Chomedey is a provincial electoral district in Quebec, Canada that elects members to the National Assembly of Quebec.  It is located in the western part of Laval. It takes in part of the Chomedey neighbourhood. It includes most of the territory bounded by the Rivière des Prairies to the south, Autoroute 15 to the east, Autoroute 440 to the north and Autoroute 13 to the west.

It was created for the 1981 election from parts of Fabre and Laval electoral districts.

In the change from the 2001 to the 2011 electoral map, it lost some territory to Fabre. In the change from the 2011 to 2017 electoral map, it will lose some more territory to Fabre, in the area around Parc Le Boutillier.

The district is named after Paul de Chomedey, Sieur de Maisonneuve, who founded Ville-Marie (now Montreal) in 1642.

Members of the National Assembly

Election results

|-

|New Democratic
|Monique Durand
|align="right"|501
|align="right"|1.58
|align="right"|-1.10
|-

|United Social Credit
|Léopold Milton
|align="right"|98
|align="right"|0.31
|align="right"|-0.04
|}

|-

|New Democratic
|Norman Buchbinder
|align="right"|799
|align="right"|2.68
|align="right"|–
|-

|Parti indépendantiste
|Lucien Chevalier
|align="right"|336
|align="right"|1.13
|align="right"|–
|-

|United Social Credit
|Léopold Milton
|align="right"|103
|align="right"|0.35
|align="right"|–
|-

|Christian Socialist
|Fabien Rivest
|align="right"|77
|align="right"|0.26
|align="right"|–
|}

|-

|-

|}

References

External links
Information
 Elections Quebec

Election results
 Election results (National Assembly)
 Election results (QuébecPolitique)

Maps
 2011 map (PDF)
 2001 map (Flash)
2001–2011 changes (Flash)
1992–2001 changes (Flash)
 Electoral map of Laval region
 Quebec electoral map, 2011

Politics of Laval, Quebec
Chomedey